Daniel Aweyue Syme is a Ghanaian politician and the deputy Upper East Regional Minister of Ghana.

References

Living people
National Democratic Congress (Ghana) politicians
Year of birth missing (living people)